Marián Čišovský (2 November 1979 – 28 June 2020) was a Slovak football defender, player of Czech side Viktoria Plzeň.

Club career
Čišovský played for his home team Chemlon Humenné until 1999, when he transferred to Inter Bratislava. While playing for Inter, he became champion of the Slovak league twice and also won the Slovak Cup twice. In 2004, he signed with MŠK Žilina. From 2006 to 2008 he played for Artmedia Bratislava, before leaving for Romania's FC Politehnica Timișoara.

He suffered a 7-month long injury and came back on 11 April 2010 and played 90 minutes against FC Ceahlăul. On 5 August 2010 he scored the qualification goal in 93rd minute against MyPa in Europa League making it 3–3. Čišovský scored one goal in 2–0 win against Oţelul Galaţi.

In 2011, he joined Czech club FC Viktoria Plzeň. He missed the entirety of their 2014–15 league conquest due to amyotrophic lateral sclerosis (ALS). Manager Miroslav Koubek said he would trade the title to cure Čišovský, who attended their title celebrations as the crowd sang his name. Čišovský died on 28 June 2020.

Honours

Club

Inter Bratislava
Slovak Super Liga: 1999–2000, 2000–01
Slovak Cup: 1999–2000, 2000–01

Artmedia Petržalka
Slovak Super Liga: 2007–08
Slovak Cup: 2007–08

Viktoria Plzeň
Czech First League: 2012–13
Czech Supercup: 2011

References

External links
  
 
 
 
 
 
 
 
 actual status from 2017 (isport.blesk.cz)

1979 births
2020 deaths
Sportspeople from Humenné
Slovak footballers
Slovakia international footballers
Slovakia under-21 international footballers
Place of death missing
Slovak expatriate footballers
ŠK Futura Humenné players
FK Inter Bratislava players
MŠK Žilina players
FC Petržalka players
FC Viktoria Plzeň players
Expatriate footballers in Romania
Expatriate footballers in the Czech Republic
Slovak expatriate sportspeople in Romania
Slovak expatriate sportspeople in the Czech Republic
Slovak Super Liga players
Liga I players
Czech First League players
FC Politehnica Timișoara players
Footballers at the 2000 Summer Olympics
Olympic footballers of Slovakia
Neurological disease deaths in Slovakia
Deaths from motor neuron disease
Association football central defenders